Alexandre Dujardin (born 24 December 1998) is a Hong Kong professional footballer who plays for Hong Kong Premier League club HKFC.

Career

Kitchee 
On 20 November 2020, Dujardin joined Kitchee.

ASA Issy 
In 2021, Alex joined ASA Issy in France to further his development with football.

HKFC 
In January 2022, Dujardin joined HKFC.

Personal life
Dujardin is the younger brother of another professional football player, Remi Dujardin, a former Hong Kong U23 international and currently playing for Sham Shui Po.

Career statistics

Club

Notes

References

Living people
1998 births
Hong Kong footballers
Hong Kong expatriate footballers
French footballers
Association football defenders
Hong Kong Premier League players
Hong Kong FC players
Kitchee SC players
Hong Kong people of French descent
Hong Kong people of Taiwanese descent